Thambiah "Terry" Pathmanathan (born 9 February 1956) is a former Singapore international footballer who played as a defender. He played for Singapore and Pahang in the Malaysia Cup. Towards the end of his career, he played for Tampines Rovers in the inaugural S.League season in 1996, retiring from playing professionally in the same year.

He played generally in the role of sweeper, as the last man in defence. He was renowned for his poise on the ball and impeccable reading of the game. He was nicknamed "Captain Marvel", for his leadership qualities, and one of his trademark moves was the long throw-in. He was the head coach for Young Lions from 2009 to 2010, and Tanjong Pagar United from 2011 to 2012.

He is currently a senior manager with the Singapore Sports Council.

Profile and achievements
 1978, Called into national team
 1980, Won Malaysia Cup
 1981, Finals of Malaysia cup lost to Selangor
 Late 1981 appointed captain of national team until 1992
 1985, 1989, Silver medalist at Sea games Thailand and Malaysia
 1985, Merlion Cup Singapore, Joint Champions with Yugoslavia
 1982, To 87 Part of Pahang Squad.
 1983, Won with Pahang 1st Malaysia Cup
 1983, Voted most exciting player in Malaysia, equivalent to footballer of the year
 1985, awarded Pahang, Pinak Jasabakti Kerja, for his contribution to the Pahang state
 1991, Sea games Philippines, Bronze medalist
 1992,Voted Singapore footballer of the year
 1990, Finals of Malaysia cup with Singapore squad
 1992, In the Tiong Bahru squad in the Singapore Premier league
 1996, In the Tampines rovers squad and start of Sleague
 1997 to 2004, Player coach for Khalsa and Singapore Recreation club in Singapore Div 1
 2005, National UNDER 21 Head coach and also assistant coach to young lions
 2009, National UNDER 23 Head coach and led the team to Laos Sea games. Won the bronze medal with youngest team ever of average age 19yrs.
 2011 to 2012, Head coach of Tanjong Pagar United football club
 2015, joined Sport Singapore

References

1956 births
Living people
Singaporean people of Tamil descent
Singaporean sportspeople of Indian descent
Singaporean footballers
Singapore international footballers
Sri Pahang FC players
Singapore FA players
Tampines Rovers FC players
Singaporean football managers
Singapore Premier League head coaches
Tanjong Pagar United FC head coaches
Young Lions FC head coaches
1984 AFC Asian Cup players
Footballers at the 1990 Asian Games
Association football defenders
Southeast Asian Games silver medalists for Singapore
Southeast Asian Games bronze medalists for Singapore
Southeast Asian Games medalists in football
Competitors at the 1985 Southeast Asian Games
Asian Games competitors for Singapore